Eugene Claire Lalley (August 12, 1922 – December 20, 1972) was an American professional basketball player. He played for the Denver Nuggets in the National Basketball League during their 1948–49 season and averaged 3.0 points per game.

References

1922 births
1972 deaths
United States Marine Corps personnel of World War II
American men's basketball players
Basketball players from Des Moines, Iowa
Creighton Bluejays men's basketball players
Denver Nuggets (1948–1950) players
Guards (basketball)